Iulian Pop (born 14 May 1907, date of death unknown) was a Romanian footballer. He was the first footballer of Politehnica Timișoara that played for Romania's national team.

International career
Iulian Pop played one friendly match for Romania, on 15 September 1929 under coach Constantin Rădulescu in a 3–2 away victory against Bulgaria.

References

External links
 

1907 births
Year of death missing
Romanian footballers
Romania international footballers
Place of birth missing
Association football defenders
FC Politehnica Timișoara players